Philodendron brandtianum is a species of plant in the genus Philodendron. A climbing epiphyte that closely hugs its host tree, it is native to southern Colombia, northern Brazi, and Bolivia in seasonally dry areas. It is also grown in temperate regions as a house plant, where it is best known for the heavy silver variegation on its juvenile leaves. It is sometimes confused for Philodendron hederaceum and Philodendron variifolium.

References

brandtianum
Plants described in 1913